The Hop Aphid, or Damson-hop aphid, (Phorodon humuli), is an aphid in the superfamily Aphidoidea in the order Hemiptera. It is a true bug and sucks sap.

Host plants
Hop aphid hosts various plants in summer and winter seasons. In winter seasons, they are known to hosts in Prunus sp. such as, Prunus domestica, Prunus spinosa, Prunus padus, and Prunus cerasifera. During summer, they hosts within Humulus lupulus, Humulus japonicus, and Urtica dioica.

References

External links
 
 Uvm.edu
 Influentialpoints.com
 Revistas.inia.es
 Bugguide.net
 Animaldiversity.org

Hemiptera of Asia
Macrosiphini
Agricultural pest insects
Humulus